The United States Air Force's 4th Air Support Operations Squadron was a combat support unit located at Mannheim, Germany with V Corps until it was inactivated in 2013.

Mission
The squadron provided tactical air command and control of airpower assets to the Joint Forces Air Component Commander and Joint Forces Land Component Commander for combat operations.  It deployed personnel and command, control, communications, and computer (C4) systems and associated support equipment and materiel in order to establish an Air Support Operations Center) as part of the Theater Air Control System and providing airpower support to US Army V Corps.

History

Lineage
 Constituted as the 4th Air Support Operations Squadron on 1 September 1996
 Activated on 30 September 1996
 Inactivated on 13 September 2013

Assignments
 4th Air Support Operations Group, 30 September 1996 – 13 September 2013

Stations
 Sullivan Barracks, Mannheim, Germany, 30 September 1996 – 13 September 2013

References

Notes

Bibliography

Air support operations squadrons of the United States Air Force